Calcium-binding protein 8 is a protein that in humans is encoded by the CALN1 gene. Alternative splicing results in multiple transcript variants.

Function 

This gene encodes a protein with high similarity to the calcium-binding proteins of the calmodulin family. The encoded protein contains two EF-hand domains and potential calcium-binding sites.

References

External links

Further reading 

 
 
 

EF-hand-containing proteins